This article includes the 2015 ITF Men's Circuit tournaments which occurred between April and June 2015.

Point Distribution

Key

Month

April

May

June

References

External links
 International Tennis Federation official website

2015 ITF Men's Circuit